The 1974 Hamilton Tiger-Cats season was the 17th season for the team in the Canadian Football League and their 25th overall. The Tiger-Cats finished in 3rd place in the Eastern Conference with a 7–9 record, but lost the Eastern Semi-Final to the Ottawa Rough Riders. In 1974, Tony Gabriel had a career year as he caught 61 passes for 795 yards to lead the East in pass receiving. It was also Gabriel's last season in Hamilton. Hamilton sent Gabriel to the Ottawa Rough Riders at the end of the season because Gabriel suggested that the players should get a raise when the East increased the number of games played from 14 to 16 in 1974.

Regular season

Season standings

Season schedule

Post-season

Awards and honours
CFL's Most Outstanding Canadian Award – Tony Gabriel (TE)
Former Ticats quarterback Bernie Faloney was inducted into the Canadian Football Hall of Fame on May 6, 1974.

CFL All-Stars
Tony Gabriel, Tight End

References

Hamilton Tiger-cats Season, 1974
Hamilton Tiger-Cats seasons
Hamilton Tiger-Cats